Trigynaea is a genus of plants in the family Annonaceae. It contains the following species (but this list may be incomplete):
 Trigynaea triplinervis D.M.Johnson & N.A.Murray

Annonaceae
Annonaceae genera
Taxonomy articles created by Polbot